Duško Grujić (born September 15, 1972) is a former Serbian footballer.

Career
Born in Kula, SR Serbia, Grujić played as defender with Serbian sides FK Hajduk Kula, FK Vojvodina and FK Borac Čačak before going abroad and playing with German side Greuther Fürth, Chinese Guangdong Hongyuan and Hungarian Békéscsaba Előre.

By Autumn 2016 he was vice-director of the youth team of FK Vojvodina.

References

External sources
 Duško Grujić at Playerhistory

1972 births
Living people
Serbian footballers
Serbian expatriate footballers
FK Hajduk Kula players
FK Vojvodina players
FK Borac Čačak players
First League of Serbia and Montenegro players
Association football defenders
Expatriate footballers in Hungary
Békéscsaba 1912 Előre footballers
Serbian expatriate sportspeople in Hungary
Expatriate footballers in China
Serbian expatriate sportspeople in China